Alfred Samuel Bean (25 August 1915 – 25 November 1993), known as Alf or Billy Bean, was an English footballer who made 171 appearances in the Football League playing for Lincoln City either side of the Second World War. He began his career as an outside left, switched to wing half, and later played even further back, at left back.

Notes

References

1915 births
1993 deaths
Sportspeople from Lincoln, England
English footballers
Association football wing halves
Association football fullbacks
Lincoln City F.C. players
English Football League players
Place of death missing